John Courtail (died 1806) was an English cleric,  Archdeacon of Lewes  from 1770 until 1806.

Courtail was born at Exeter, the son of French parents. He matriculated at Clare College, Cambridge in 1732, graduating B.A. in 1736 and M.A. in 1739. He was a Fellow of Clare from 1736, becoming senior proctor. He was rector of Great Gransden and Burwash, becoming Archdeacon of Lewes in 1770. James Hurdis became Courtail's curate at Burwash in 1786, and dedicated to him the 1788 poem The Village Curate.

References

Archdeacons of Lewes
18th-century English people
19th-century English people
1806 deaths